The Yiyang-Loudi-Hengyang Expressway commonly abbreviated as Yilouheng Expressway, is an expressway in Hunan province, China that connects Yiyang, Loudi, and Hengyang.  It is 222.632 km in length.

Route
The expressway passes the following major cities:

 Shuangfeng County
 Hengyang County
 Qidong County
 Taojiang County
 Heshan District, Yiyang
 Ningxiang
 Xiangxiang
 Louxing District

Scenic spots
 Goulou Mountain National Forest Park
 Mount Heng (Hunan)
 Taojiang Scenic Spot
 Xia Minghan's Former Residence
 Wang Fuzhi's Former Residence
 Luo Ronghuan's Former Residence
 Zeng Guofan's Former Residence
 Meishan Palace
 Liu Shaoqi's Former Residence
 Huitang Hot Spring
 Miyin Temple

References

Expressways in Hunan
Expressways in Changsha
Expressways in Xiangxiang
Expressways in Loudi
Expressways in Lianyuan
2017 establishments in China